Himes is a surname. Notable people with the surname include:

 Andrew Himes (born 1950), American author and social activist
 Charles Francis Himes (active 1900), American science professor at Carlisle Indian Industrial School
 Chester Himes (1909–1984), African-American writer
 Dick Himes (born 1946), American football offensive lineman
 Donald Himes, Canadian actor in the children's television series Butternut Square and Mr. Dressup
 George H. Himes (1844–1940), American pioneer and historian in Oregon
 Gregory A. Himes (1966), American College Basketball Coach
 Harriette Himes (1930–1997), birth name of American Ann Bishop (journalist)
 Jack Himes (1878–1949), American baseball player
 Jim Himes (born 1966), American politician
 Joseph H. Himes (1885–1960), American politician
 Joshua Vaughan Himes (1805–1895), American Christian leader and publisher
 Kenneth R. Himes (born 1950), American Roman Catholic theologian
 Lance Himes, American administrator, a defendant in Obergefell v. Himes
 Larry Himes (born 1940), American Major League Baseball general manager
 Michael Himes, American priest
 Norman Himes (1903–1958), Canadian ice hockey centre
 Norman E. Himes (1899-1949), American sociologist and economist 
 Tyruss Himes (born 1972), American rapper known as Big Syke
 William Himes, noted composer for brass bands

See also
 Himes (disambiguation)
 Hime (surname), including a list of people with that surname
 Hines (name), including a list of people with that name